This article is about music-related events in 1881.

Specific locations
1881 in Norwegian music

Events

March 23 – A fire caused by a gas explosion destroys the Opéra de Nice in the south of France with fatalities.
February 10 – Offenbach's Tales of Hoffmann debuts in Paris
June 11 – The National Theatre (Prague) receives a royal opening with the premiere of Smetana's opera Libuše (written 1871–72); however, a subsequent fire delays public opening for a further 2 years, when the same work reinaugurates the theatre
September 3 – Anton Bruckner completes his 6th Symphony
November 9 – Johannes Brahms' Piano Concerto No. 2 is given its public premiere in Budapest
December 4 – Pyotr Ilyich Tchaikovsky's Violin Concerto is premiered in Vienna

Bands formed
 Brighouse and Rastrick Brass Band

Published popular music
 "Good Bye!" by Francesco Paolo Tosti
 "My Bonnie Lies over the Ocean"
 "Slowly and Sadly" (President Garfield Memorial Tribute)" by Arabella M. Root

Classical music
 Victor Bendix – Symphony No. 1 in C op. 16 Mountain Climbing
Alexander Borodin – String Quartet No. 2 in D
 Johannes Brahms – Tragic Overture op. 81 revised; Nänie op. 82
 Max Bruch – Kol Nidre for cello and orchestra finished
 Anton Bruckner – Symphony No. 6 (Bruckner)
 Emmanuel Chabrier – Pièces pittoresques for piano
 Ernest Chausson –  Piano Trio in G minor, op. 3
 Gabriel Fauré & André Messager – Messe des pêcheurs de Villerville
 César Franck – Rébecca (oratorio)
 Robert Fuchs – Cello Sonata No.1, Op.29
 Franz Liszt – Nuages Gris
 Giuseppe Martucci – Fantasia for piano op. 51
 Camille Saint-Saëns – Hymne à Victor Hugo
 Eduard Strauss 
 Glockensignale, Op.198
 Schleier und Krone, Op.200
 Richard Strauss 
 String Quartet in A major, Op.2
 5 Klavierstücke, Op.3
 Cello Sonata, Op.6
 Charles-Marie Widor – First Sonata for Piano and Violin op. 50
 Bernard Zweers – Symphony No. 1 in D major
 Władysław Żeleński – 2 Mazurkas, Op.31

Opera
Johann Strauss, Jr. – Der lustige Krieg, premiered November 24 in Vienna
Pyotr Ilyich Tchaikovsky – The Maid of Orleans
Giuseppe Verdi – Simon Boccanegra, revised version of the 21st Verdi opera premieres at La Scala in Milan

Musical theater
 The Tales of Hoffmann (Les contes d'Hoffmann; Jacques Offenbach) – Paris production opened at the Opéra-Comique on February 10 
 The Mascot (translation of Edmond Audran's La Mascotte) – Broadway production opened at the Bijou Theatre (Manhattan) on May 5
 Patience (Gilbert and Sullivan) – London production opened at the Opera Comique on April 23 and transferred to the new Savoy Theatre on October 10 for a total run of 578 performances

Births
January 4 – Nikolai Roslavets, Ukrainian composer (d. 1944)
February 6 – Karl Weigl, Austrian composer (d. 1949)
February 12 – Anna Pavlova, Russian ballerina and actress (d. 1931)
February 21 – Kenneth J. Alford, English band composer (d. 1945)
March 10 – Frank Mullings, English tenor (d. 1953)
March 16 – Fannie Charles Dillon, American composer (d. 1947)
March 18 – Paul Le Flem, French composer (d. 1984)
March 23 – Egon Petri, Dutch-born pianist (d. 1962)
March 25 – Béla Bartók, Hungarian composer (d. 1945)
April 15 – David Thomas, Welsh composer (d. 1928)
April 17 – Anton Wildgans, lyricist and playwright (died 1942)
April 20 – Nikolai Myaskovsky, Polish-born Russian composer and teacher (d. 1950)
May 11 – Jan van Gilse, Dutch composer (d. 1944)
May 29 – Frederick Septimus Kelly, Australian-born musician (k. 1916)
July 6 – Nancy Dalberg, Danish composer (d. 1949)
August 15 – Ted Snyder, American composer and music publisher (d. 1965)
August 18 – Hermann Zilcher, German composer (died 1948)
August 19 – George Enescu, Romanian composer (d. 1955)
August 29 – Edvin Kallstenius, Swedish composer (d. 1967)
November 22 – Ethel Levey, American singer, dancer and actress (d. 1955)
November 28 – Stefan Zweig, Austrian librettist of Richard Strauss's  Die schweigsame Frau (suicide 1942)
December 3 – Henry Fillmore, American band composer (d. 1956)
December 24 – Charles Wakefield Cadman, American composer and songwriter (d. 1946)

Deaths
January 30 – Jacques-Nicolas Lemmens, Belgian, organist and composer, 58
March 13 – Sophie Daguin, ballerina and choreographer, 79
March 23 – Nikolai Rubinstein, pianist and composer, 45
March 28 – Modest Mussorgsky, composer, 42 (alcohol-related)
June 5 – Franjo Krežma, violinist and composer,19 (tuberculosis)
June 6 – Henri Vieuxtemps, composer, 61
June 7 – Marie Gabriel Augustin Savard, music teacher and composer, 66
July 3 – Achille De Bassini, operatic baritone, 62
September 7 – Sidney Lanier, poet and flautist, 39 (tuberculosis)
October 9 – Richard Wüerst, composer and music teacher, 57
November 25 – Theobald Boehm, inventor of the modern flute, 87
December 17 – Giulio Briccialdi, composer, 63
December 30 – Corrado Miraglia, opera singer, 60
date unknown – Francisco de Sá Noronha, violinist and composer (b. 1820)

References

 
19th century in music
Music by year